Mount Ege is a mountain in Antarctica,  high, between Berquist Ridge and Drury Ridge in the Neptune Range of the Pensacola Mountains. It was mapped by the United States Geological Survey from surveys and from U.S. Navy air photos, 1956–66, and was named by the Advisory Committee on Antarctic Names for John R. Ege, a geologist with the Neptune Range field party in 1963–64.

References 

Mountains of Queen Elizabeth Land
Pensacola Mountains